Rumen Peshev (born 13 August 1954) is a Bulgarian boxer. He competed in the men's featherweight event at the 1976 Summer Olympics. At the 1976 Summer Olympics, he lost to Gustavo de la Cruz of the Dominican Republic in his first fight.

References

1954 births
Living people
Bulgarian male boxers
Olympic boxers of Bulgaria
Boxers at the 1976 Summer Olympics
Place of birth missing (living people)
Featherweight boxers